Posterior amorphous corneal dystrophy (PACD) is a rare form of corneal dystrophy. It is not yet linked to any chromosomal locus. The first report describing this dystrophy dates back to 1977.

References

External links 

Disorders of sclera and cornea